Pete Sampras was the defending champion.

Sampras successfully defended his title, beating Thomas Enqvist 7–5, 7–6(7–3) in the final.

Seeds

Draw

Finals

Top half

Bottom half

Qualifying

Qualifying seeds

Qualifiers

Lucky loser
  Emilio Benfele Álvarez

Qualifying draw

First qualifier

Second qualifier

Third qualifier

Fourth qualifier

References

External links
 Official results archive (ATP)
 Official results archive (ITF)

U.S. Pro Indoor
1998 ATP Tour